is a Japanese four-panel manga series written and illustrated by Etsuya Mashima. The manga was serialized in Takeshobo's Manga Life Original and Manga Life MOMO magazines from 2002 to 2014 and the chapters collected into 10 tankōbon volumes. A 26-episode anime television series adaptation animated by Silver Link aired between July 1, 2012 and December 24, 2012.

Characters

The main character, an elementary school girl who has a crush on Hiroshi after he allegedly rescued her. She is incredibly strong and athletic for her age.

A kind man who works at the town hall next to Chitose's school. He is often paranoid about Chitose's affections for him.

Chitose's classmate and best friend who is something of a worrywart. She has an incredible father complex and wants to become his bride when she grows up.

Chitose's friend and classmate, who, despite her regal looks, is a little strange.  She seems to always have a costume for every major occasion.

Chitose's homeroom teacher, who is constantly at odds against Chitose, primarily being her "rival" for Hiroshi's affections.

A young teacher who is Asako's junior.

Shige is Hiroshi's boss.

Media

Manga
Chitose Get You!! began as a manga series written and illustrated by Etsuya Mashima. It was serialized in Takeshobo's Manga Life Original and Manga Life MOMO from September 2002 to June 2014 and the chapters collected into 10 tankōbon volumes. The series is available in English on the JManga reader site.

Drama CD
Two drama CDs were released on December 22, 2005 and June 23, 2006 respectively.

Anime
A 26-episode anime television series adaptation animated by Silver Link aired between July 1, 2012 and December 24, 2012. The anime was streamed on Nico Nico Douga and Crunchyroll.

Episode list

References

External links
Official website 

2012 anime television series debuts
Comedy anime and manga
Silver Link
Slice of life anime and manga
Takeshobo manga
Yonkoma
Seinen manga